Patrick McGowan may refer to:
 Patrick McGowan (Irish politician) (1926–1999), Fianna Fáil politician
 Patrick McGowan (New York politician) (1842–1893), Irish-American politician
 Patrick D. McGowan (born 1951), American politician from Minnesota and law enforcement officer
 Patrick K. McGowan, American politician from Maine
 Pat McGowan (born 1954), American golfer
 Pat McGowan (footballer) (born 1959), Scottish footballer

See also
 Paddy McGowan, politician in Northern Ireland